This is a list of 52 species of molluscs that have been introduced into Venezuela, that are living in the wild, and that have been reported in the literature.
 Marine gastropods: 7 species
 Freshwater gastropods: 5 species
 Land gastropods: 22 species
 Marine bivalves: 18 species
 Estuarine bivalves: 2 species
 Total number of introduced mollusc species: 52

Gastropoda

Marine gastropods
Buccinidae
 Babylonia aerolata (Link, 1807)

Fasciolariidae
 Fusinus barbarensis (Trask, 1855)
 Fusinus marmoratus (Phillipi, 1844)

Modulidae
 Modulus cerodes (A. Adams, 1851)

Turbinellidae
 Vasum ceramicum (Linnaeus, 1758)

Umbraculidae
 Umbraculum plicatulum (Von Martens, 1881)

Freshwater gastropods
Ampullariidae
 Pomacea bridgesi (Reeve, 1856) Ojasti, Juhani., González Jiménez, Eduardo, Szeplaki Otahola, Eduardo. y García Román, Luis B. 2001: Informe sobre las especies exótica en Venezuela. Ministerio del Ambiente y de los Recursos Naturales Caracas. 207p. 
 Pomacea canaliculata (Lamarck, 1819)

Planorbidae
 Planorbella duryi (Wetherby 1879)

Thiaridae

 Melanoides tuberculata (Müller, 1774)
 Thiara granifera (Lamarck, 1822)

Land gastropods
Achatinidae

 Achatina fulica (Bowdich, 1822)

Arionidae

 Arion subfuscus (Draparnaud, 1805)

Bradybaenidae
 Bradybaena similaris (Fèrussac, 1821)

Ferussaciidae
 Cecilioides acicula (Müller 1774)
 Cecilioides aperta (Swainson, 1840)

Helicidae

 Cepaea Held, 1838
Cornu aspersum = Helix aspersa (Müller, 1774)
 Helix pomatia Linnaeus, 1758
 Otala Schumacher, 1817
 Theba pisana (Müller, 1774)

Limacidae
 Agriolimax laevis (Müller, 1774)
 Agriolimax reticulatus (Müller, 1774)
 Lehmannia valenciana (Férussac, 1822) 
 Milax gagatex (Draparnaud)

Streptaxidae
 Gulella bicolor (Hutton, 1834)

Subulinidae
 Allopeas micra (d’Orbigny, 1835)
 Lamellaxis mauritianus (Pfeiffer, 1952)
 Opeas gracile (Hutton, 1834)
 Opeas pumilum (Pfeiffer, 1847)
 Opeas pyrgula  Schmacker and Boettger, 1891
 Subulina octona (Bruguière, 1798)
 Subulina striatella (Rang, 1831)

Bivalvia

Marine bivalves
Arcidae
 Arca pacifica (Sowerby, 1833)

Donacidae
 Donax clathratus (Revee, 1854)

Mactridae
 Mactronella exoleta (Gray, 1837)
 Rangia mendica (Gold, 1851)

Mytilidae

 Gregariella corallophiga (Gmelin 1781)
 Perna perna (Linnaeus, 1758)
 Perna viridis (Linnaeus, 1758)

Placunidae
 Placuna placenta Linnaeus, 1758

Pteriidae

 Pteria hirundo (Linnaeus, 1758)
Semelidae
 Cumingia lamellosa (Sowerby, 1833)

Tellinidae
 Strigilla pseudocarnaria Boss, 1969

Teredinidae
 Lyodus pedicellatus (Quarterfages, 1849)
 Bankia carinata (Gray, 1827
 Bankia martensi Stempel 1899

Thraciidae
 Thracia distorta (Montagu, 1803)

Veneridae
 Cincomphalus strigillinus (Dall, 1902)
 Clausinella gayi (Hupé, 1854)
 Clausinella fasciata (Da Costa, 1778)

Estuarine bivalves
Corbiculidae

 Corbicula fluminalis (Múller, 1774)

Mytilidae

 Musculista senhousia (Benson, 1842)

See also
 List of echinoderms of Venezuela
 List of Poriferans of Venezuela
 List of marine molluscs of Venezuela
 List of molluscs of Falcón state, Venezuela
 List of non-marine molluscs of El Hatillo Municipality, Miranda, Venezuela
 List of non-marine molluscs of Venezuela
 List of birds of Venezuela
 List of mammals of Venezuela

References

External links
 Estudio sobre el estado actual de las Especies Exóticas. Juhani. Ojasti. Obra suministrada por la Secretaría General de la Comunidad Andina. 2001
 Pérez, Julio E., Alfonsi, Carmen., Salazar, Sinatra K., Macsotay, Oliver., Barrios, Jorge. & Martínez Escarbassiere, Rafael. 2007: Especies marinas exóticas y criptogénicas en las costas de Venezuela. Boletín del Instituto Oceanográfico de Venezuela. 46 (1): 79-96.

.Introduced
Venezuela, Molluscs
Molluscs, Introduced
Venezuelas, Introduced
Introduced Molluscs
Venezuela molluscs